Bodybuilding at the 2007 Southeast Asian Games was held at the 70th Anniversary Hall, Nakhon Ratchasima Rajabhat University, Nakhon Ratchasima, Thailand. The body building schedule began on December 10 to December 11.

Medal tally

Medalists

Men

Women

External links
 Southeast Asian Games Official Results

2007 Southeast Asian Games events
2007
Bodybuilding competitions in Thailand
2007 in bodybuilding